The 2014 United States Senate election in Minnesota was held on November 4, 2014, to elect a member of the United States Senate to represent the State of Minnesota, concurrently with the election of the Governor of Minnesota, as well as other elections to the United States Senate in other states and elections to the United States House of Representatives and various state and local elections.

Incumbent Democratic–Farmer–Labor Senator Al Franken ran for re-election to a second term. Primary elections were held on August 12, 2014, in which Franken was renominated and the Republicans picked financial executive Mike McFadden. In the general election, Franken defeated him and Independence Party nominee Steve Carlson and Heather Johnson of the Libertarian Party with 53% of the vote.

Background 
Franken challenged incumbent Republican Senator Norm Coleman in 2008. When the initial count was completed on November 18, Franken was trailing Coleman by 215 votes. This close margin triggered a mandatory recount. After reviewing ballots that had been challenged during the recount and counting 953 wrongly rejected absentee ballots, the State Canvassing Board officially certified the recount results with Franken holding a 225-vote lead.

On January 6, 2009, Coleman's campaign filed an election contest and on April 13, a three-judge panel dismissed Coleman's Notice of Contest and ruled that Franken had won the election by 312 votes. Coleman's appeal of the panel's decision to the Minnesota Supreme Court was unanimously rejected on June 30, and he conceded the election. Franken was sworn in as Minnesota's junior senator on July 7, 2009.

Because Franken's margin of victory was so slim, the seat was initially thought to be a top target for Republicans, but Politico reported in a May 2013 article that Franken's high approval rating, his large war chest, and the Republicans' struggle to find a top-tier candidate meant that Franken was the "heavy favorite" in the 2014 election.

Democratic–Farmer–Labor primary

Candidates

Declared 
 Al Franken, incumbent U.S. Senator
 Sandra Henningsgard

Results

Republican primary 
At the Republican State Convention on May 30–31, 2014, after ten ballots, Mike McFadden received the party's endorsement. Chris Dahlberg, Monti Moreno, Julianne Ortman and Phillip Parrish had all sought the endorsement but withdrew in favor of McFadden. Only Jim Abeler continued in the race and contested the August primary against McFadden. David Carlson did not participate in the convention after a dispute with party leadership over nominating petitions. He, Patrick D. Munro and Ole Savior also appeared on the ballot.

Candidates

Declared 
 Jim Abeler, state representative
 David Carlson, veteran and candidate for the U.S. Senate in 2012
 Mike McFadden, financial executive
 Patrick D. Munro
 Ole Savior, perennial candidate

Withdrew 
 Chris Dahlberg, St. Louis County commissioner
 Monti Moreno, bison farmer, former hair salon owner and candidate for the U.S. Senate in 1996
 Julianne Ortman, state senator
 Phillip Parrish, U.S. Navy reservist
 Harold Shudlick, retired U.S. Army chaplain and candidate for the U.S. Senate in 2006 and 2012

Declined 
 Michele Bachmann, U.S. Representative
 Laura Brod, former state representative
 Norm Coleman, former U.S. Senator
 Chip Cravaack, former U.S. Representative
 Bill Guidera, finance chair of the Republican Party of Minnesota
 Pete Hegseth, CEO of Concerned Veterans for America, former executive director of Vets For Freedom and candidate for the U.S. Senate in 2012
 John Kline, U.S. Representative
 Jason Lewis, radio talk show host and political commentator
 Erik Paulsen, U.S. Representative
 Tim Pawlenty, former governor of Minnesota
 Rich Stanek, Hennepin County Sheriff

Endorsements

Polling 

Republican primary

Results

Independence primary 
The Independence Party of Minnesota state convention was held on May 17, 2014, at Minnesota State University, Mankato. Businessman Kevin Terrell won the party's endorsement, but lost the primary to Steve Carlson. Carlson did not ask for an endorsement from the Independence Party and self-identifies with the Tea party. For their part, the Independence Party has disowned Carlson, who has defended Todd Akin's controversial "legitimate rape" comments and said that George Zimmerman "provided a valuable service" by killing Trayvon Martin.

Candidates

Declared 
 Jack Shepard, dentist, convicted felon, fugitive and perennial candidate
 Kevin Terrell, business consultant

Withdrew 
 Hannah Nicollet (running for governor)

Results

Libertarian convention 
The Libertarian Party of Minnesota state convention was held on April 26, 2014, in Maple Grove.

Candidates

Nominee 
 Heather Johnson

General election

Debates 
 Complete video of debate, October 1, 2014
 Complete video of debate, October 26, 2014

Predictions

Polling

Results

See also 
 2014 Minnesota elections

References

External links 
 U.S. Senate elections in Minnesota, 2014 at Ballotpedia
 Campaign contributions at OpenSecrets

Official campaign websites (Archived)
 Jim Abeler
 Chris Dahlberg
 Al Franken
 Mike McFadden
 Monti Moreno
 Julianne Ortman
 Phillip Parrish
 Kevin Terrell

2014
Minnesota
2014 Minnesota elections
Al Franken